Mary McMullen, a pseudonym for Mary Reilly (1920–1986), was an American mystery writer who studied art and worked in fashion design and advertising before becoming an author in 1951. She won the Edgar Allan Poe Award for best first novel, Strangle Hold, in 1952.

Born in Yonkers, New York, in 1920, McMullen was the daughter of Paul Reilly, an artist, and Helen Reilly, a mystery writer who published under the pseudonym Kieran Abbey as well as her own name. McMullen's sister Ursula Curtiss also wrote mysteries.

McMullen died in 1986.

Bibliography
 Strangle Hold (1951) 
 Death of Miss X (1952) 
 The Doom Campaign (1974) 
 A Country Kind of Death (1975) 
 The Pimlico Plot (1975) 
 Funny, Jonas, You Don't Look Dead (1976) 
 A Dangerous Funeral (1977) 
 Death by Bequest (1977) 
 Prudence Be Damned (1978) 
 The Man With Fifty Complaints (1978) 
 Welcome to the Grave (1979)  
 But Nellie Was So Nice (1979) 
 My Cousin Death (1980)  
 Something of the Night (1980) 
 The Other Shoe (1981) 
 Better Off Dead (1982) 
 Until Death Do Us Part (1982) 
 A Grave Without Flowers (1983) 
 The Gift Horse (1985) 
 The Bad News Man (1986)

References

1920 births
1986 deaths
20th-century American women writers
Writers from New York (state)
American crime fiction writers